Laura Schiff Bean, born in New York state, is a contemporary visual artist. Prior to becoming a career artist, she earned a degree in psychology from George Washington University and then worked in print advertising in Boston, Massachusetts. Laura Schiff Bean went on to get her Masters in Fine Arts (MFA) from School of the Museum of Fine Arts at Tufts. Her inspiration is derived from artists such as Lucien Freud, Jenny Saville, and Jim Dine.

Bean is known "for her dress 'portraits' painted with many layers of thick dripping paint." She tries to imbue the paintings with a sense of the wearer.

Solo/Collaborative Exhibitions 

 2021. REPRESENTATIONAL PAINTING, Gilman Contemporary, Ketchum ID 2020 EVOLVED, Gilman Contemporary, Ketchum, ID
  2020 EVOLVED, Gilman Contemporary, Ketchum, ID
 2018   UNTOLD STORIES, Gilman Contemporary, Ketchum Idaho
 2017   THE WEIGHT OF WORDS, Blue Gallery, Kansas City, MO
 2015   REDEFINED, Patricia Rovzar Gallery Seattle, WA
 2014   DEFINED, Gilman Contemporary Ketchum, Idaho
 2015   WITHOUT WORDS, Lanoue Gallery, Boston, MA
 2013   Argazzi Art, Lakevill, CT
 2012   "SHE COMES AND GOES AS SHE PLEASES" Gilman Contemporary, ID
 2012   NEW WORK Argazzi Art, Lakeville, CT
 2011   "24/7" Lanoue Fine Art, Boston, MA
 2010   NEW WORK Pryor Fine Art, Atlanta
 2010   Blue Gallery, KC, MO
 2009   INTERSECTIONS: Between Dreams and Memory. Gallery One, Nashville.
 2009   NEW WORK  Bennett Street Gallery, Atlanta
 2009   JOURNEY Lanoue Fine Art, Boston
 2007   VISIONS: Contemporary Women Artists, Eleanor D. Wilson Museum, Hollins University. Roanoke, VA

Group exhibitions 

2018    Art Market San Francisco, Simon Breittbard Fine Arts, SF, CA
2018   Lanoue Gallery, Boston, MA
2017   DRESS MATTERS: CLOTHING AS METAPHOR - TUCSON MUSEUM OF ART, Tucson, AZ
2017   Lanoue Gallery, Boston, MA
2017   Georges Bergès Gallery, NY, NY- Summer Group show
2017   Georges Bergès Gallery, NY, NY
2016   Lanoue Fine Art
2016   Gilman Contemporary, Ketchum, ID
2015   Gilman Contemporary, Ketchum, ID
2015   Lanoue Fine Art, Boston, MA
2014   Lanoue Fine Art, Boston, MA
2014   Patricia Rovzar Gallery, Seattle, WA
2014   C Parker Gallery, CT "Yes She Can"
2013   Lanoue Fine Art, MA "A Few Of My Favorite Things"
2012   Argazzi Fine Art, Lakeville, CT
2012   Lanoue Fine Art, MA "Summer Salon Show"
2012   Rosenbaum Contemporary, Boca Raton, FL
2012   Floria/Forre, Aspen, CO
2012   Art MRKT San Francisco 2012
2012   Argazzi Fine Art, Lakeville, CT
2012   West Branch Gallery, Stowe, VT
2012   Forre Fine Art, Aspen/Vail, CO
2011   Gilman Contemporary, Ketchum Idaho
2011   Spring Group Show, Lanoue Fine Art
2011   Forre Fine Art, Aspen, CO
2010   Lanoue Fine Art, Boston, MA
2010   Blue Gallery, Kansas City, MO
2010   Lanoue FIne Art, Boston, MA
2009   Lanoue Fine Art, Boston, MA
2009   Bennett Street Gallery, Atlanta, GA
2008   Lanoue Fine Art, Boston, MA
2008   Bennett Street Gallery, Atlanta, GA
2008   Gallery One, Nashville, TN: 3 person show, "In Minds Eye"
2007   Cumberland Gallery, Nashville, TN "Packages Large & Small"
2007   Cumberland Gallery, Nashville, TN 2007 "Artists In Heat"
2007   Lanoue Fine Art, Boston, MA "VISIONS: Contemporary Female Artists"
2007   Lanoue Fine Art Boston, MA GroupShow 
2006   Etheringon Fine Art, Vineyard Haven Group Show
2005   Windsor Gallery, Dania, FL Group Show

References 

  7  Dress Matters:Clothing as Metaphor. Tucson Weekly. https://www.tucsonweekly.com/tucson/dress-matters/Content?oid=14135436

Living people
21st-century American women artists
Artists from New York (state)
George Washington University alumni
Year of birth missing (living people)